The men's 200 metre freestyle competition of the swimming events at the 2011 World Aquatics Championships took place July 25 and 26. The heats and semifinals took place July 25 and the final was held July 26.

Records
Prior to the competition, the existing world and championship records were as follows.

Results

Heats

60 swimmers participated in 8 heats, qualified swimmers are listed:

Semifinals
The semifinal were held at 18:57.

Semifinal 1

Semifinal 2

Final
The final was held at 18:02.

References

External links
2011 World Aquatics Championships: Men's 200 metre freestyle entry list, from OmegaTiming.com; retrieved 2011-07-23.
FINA World Championships, Swimming: Ryan Lochte Bests Michael Phelps For 200 Free Gold, Swimming World Magazine (2011-07-26); retrieved 2011-08-11.

Freestyle 0200 metre, men's
World Aquatics Championships